Eduard Willem Treijtel (born 28 May 1946) is a Dutch former professional footballer who played as a goalkeeper. He won the Intercontinental Cup in 1970 and the UEFA Cup in the 1973–74 season with Feyenoord.

Club career 
Treijtel was born in Rotterdam. He joined Feyenoord from Xerxes/DHC in 1968 along with Willem van Hanegem. On 15 November 1970, Treijtel took down a gull with the ball from a goal-kick during the derby between Sparta Rotterdam and Feyenoord Rotterdam. That gull was later put in Feyenoord's Home of History, but notable Sparta fans want it to be transferred to Sparta's museum. Treijtel moved to AZ'67 in 1979. He retired in 1985.

International career 
Treijtel obtained five caps for the Netherlands national team. He represented his country in two FIFA World Cup qualification matches and was a non-playing squad member at the 1974 FIFA World Cup.

References

External links 

 
  Profile

1946 births
Living people
Dutch footballers
Netherlands international footballers
Association football goalkeepers
XerxesDZB players
Feyenoord players
AZ Alkmaar players
Footballers from Rotterdam
1974 FIFA World Cup players
Eredivisie players
UEFA Cup winning players